Alfonso Lastra Chárriez (1887-1946) was a Puerto Rican lawyer and politician from the Liberal Party of Puerto Rico.

Early years
Was born in the year 1887 in Yabucoa, Puerto Rico to Juan Lastra and Alfonsina Charriez. Alfonso Lastra Chárriez was a lawyer before becoming a politician.

Politics
Alfonso Lastra Chárriez was a member of the Liberal Party of Puerto Rico. Got elected to the Puerto Rico House of Representatives that included a term as Speaker pro tempore of the House of Representatives of Puerto Rico from 1921 to 1924. In 1937 was elected as an at-large member for the Puerto Rico Senate.

Legacy 
Was a prominent member of the Liberal Party of Puerto Rico. He died in 1946 in San Juan, Puerto Rico and was buried at the Puerto Rico Memorial Cemetery in Carolina, Puerto Rico.

References

|-

1887 births
1946 deaths
Members of the Senate of Puerto Rico
People from Yabucoa, Puerto Rico
20th-century American politicians